Issara Sereewatthanawut (born October 12, 1983 in Bangkok –) is a Thai politician who served a party-list MP in the 25th House of Representatives and deputy secretary-general of the Democrat Party.

Biography and career
The eldest son among the three children of the family that operates auto parts business through joint ventures with companies in Asia and Europe. Sereewatthanawut graduated from Bangkok Christian College, secondary school from Suankularb Wittayalai School and Triam Udom Suksa School. He holds a bachelor's degree (honours) in chemical engineering from the Faculty of Engineering, Chulalongkorn University, master's degree in public administration from Ramkhamhaeng University, and completed a Ph.D. in engineering from Imperial College London.

He used to be a businessman and special instructor in many public and private tertiary institutions. His academic title is assistant professor.

Politically, Sereewatthanawut is a former secretary to the President of the National Assembly, Chuan Leekpai. In early May 2022, he was appointed as head of Democrat Party's committee on modern economy, replacing Prinn Panitchpakdi who resigned over his alleged sexual misconduct.

Notes

External links
 

1983 births
Living people
Issara Sereewatthanawut
Issara Sereewatthanawut
Issara Sereewatthanawut
Issara Sereewatthanawut
Issara Sereewatthanawut
Issara Sereewatthanawut
Issara Sereewatthanawut
Alumni of Imperial College London
Issara Sereewatthanawut